The 2018–19 NBL season was the 36th season for Melbourne United in the NBL, and the 5th under the banner of Melbourne United.

Roster

Preseason

Game log 

|-style="background:#cfc;"
| 1
| 4 August
| Chinese Taipei
| W 136–85
| not available 
| not available 
| not available 
| Melbourne Sports and Aquatic Centreclosed indoors
| 1–0
|-style="background:#cfc;"
| 2
| 9 August
| Saint Mary's Gaels
| W 81–80
| not available 
| not available 
| not available 
| State Basketball Centre3,200
| 2–0
|-style="background:#cfc;"
| 3
| 16 August
| Loyola Marymount Lions
| W 100–80
| not available
| not available
| not available
| Casey Basketball Stadium1,500
| 3–0
|-style="background:#cfc;"
| 4
| 30 August
| Sydney
| W 93–85
| not available
| not available
| not available
| Bendigo Stadium2,000
| 4–0

|-style="background:#fcc;"
| 5
| 1 September 
| Sydney
| L 85–93
| not available
| not available
| not available
| State Basketball Centre3,200
| 4–1
|-style="background:#cfc;"
| 6
| 11 September 
| Cairns
| W 89–88
| Josh Boone (18)
| Josh Boone (9)
| Chris Goulding (7)
| Dandenong Basketball Stadium1,000
| 5–1
|-style="background:#fcc;"
| 7
| 13 September 
| Cairns
| L 75–78
| not available
| not available
| not available
| Melbourne Sports and Aquatic Centre2,000
| 5–2
|-style="background:#fcc;"
| 8
| 20 September 
| Adelaide
| L 87–97
| Casper Ware (16)
| Kennedy, Smith-Milner (6)
| McCarron, Ware (3)
| Bendigo Stadiumnot available
| 5–3
|-style="background:#cfc;"
| 9
| 22 September 
| @ Brisbane
| W 90–96
| Casper Ware (15)
| David Barlow (9)
| Casper Ware (5)
| Ballarat Stadiumnot available
| 6–3
|-style="background:#cfc;"
| 10
| 23 September 
| Illawarra
| W 88–82
| Chris Goulding (20)
| Alex Pledger (11)
| Mitch McCarron (7)
| Ballarat Stadiumnot available
| 7–3
|-style="background:#fcc;"
| 11
| 28 September 
| @ Philadelphia
| L 104–84
| Casper Ware (19)
| Alex Pledger (13)
| Casper Ware (5)
| Wells Fargo Center20,318
| 7–4

|-style="background:#fcc;"
| 12
| 5 October
| @ Toronto
| L 120–82
| Casper Ware (17)
| Josh Boone (11)
| Casper Ware (5)
| Scotiabank Arena15,781
| 7–5

Regular season

Ladder 

The NBL tie-breaker system as outlined in the NBL Rules and Regulations states that in the case of an identical win–loss record, the overall points percentage between the teams will determine order of seeding.

1Perth Wildcats won on overall points percentage. Melbourne United finished 2nd on overall points percentage. 

2Brisbane Bullets won on overall points percentage. 

3New Zealand Breakers won on overall points percentage.

Game log 

|-style="background:#cfc;"
| 1
| 12 October 
| @ Illawarra
| W 122–123 (4OT)
| Josh Boone (24)
| Josh Boone (12)
| Casper Ware (9)
| WIN Entertainment Centre2,688
| 1–0
|-style="background:#fcc;"
| 2
| 14 October 
| New Zealand
| L 81–88
| Chris Goulding (22)
| Mitch McCarron (8)
| Hooley, McCarron (4)
| Melbourne Arena8,329
| 1–1
|-style="background:#cfc;"
| 3
| 21 October
| Adelaide
| W 75–72
| Barlow, Boone (15)
| Josh Boone (16)
| Barlow, Goulding, McCarron (5)
| Melbourne Arena7,764
| 2–1
|-style="background:#fcc;"
| 4
| 27 October
| @ Perth
| L 101–96 (2OT)
| Chris Goulding (29)
| Josh Boone (11)
| Mitch McCarron (5)
| RAC Arena11,675
| 2–2
|-style="background:#cfc;"
| 5
| 29 October
| Illawarra
| W 99–93
| Casper Ware (26)
| Alex Pledger (12)
| Mitch McCarron (4)
| Melbourne Arena6,478
| 3–2

|-style="background:#cfc;"
| 6
| 3 November
| @ Cairns
| W 85–98
| Casper Ware (32)
| Barlow, Boone (7)
| Barlow, Hooley, Kennedy (4)
| Cairns Convention Centrenot available
| 4–2
|-style="background:#cfc;"
| 7
| 5 November
| Sydney
| W 77–70
| D. J. Kennedy (24)
| Boone, Kennedy (10)
| Kennedy, Ware (3)
| Melbourne Arena10,300
| 5–2
|-style="background:#fcc;"
| 8
| 8 November
| @ Illawarra
| L 87–81
| McCarron, Ware (18)
| Josh Boone (8)
| Josh Boone (6)
| WIN Entertainment Centre2,000
| 5–3
|-style="background:#cfc;"
| 9
| 11 November
| Cairns
| W 87–80
| Casper Ware (34)
| Mitch McCarron (9)
| Casper Ware (6)
| Melbourne Arena7,897
| 6–3
|-style="background:#cfc;"
| 10
| 16 November
| @ New Zealand
| W 101–108
| Josh Boone (26)
| Josh Boone (10)
| D. J. Kennedy (7)
| ILT Stadium2,676
| 7–3
|-style="background:#cfc;"
| 11
| 18 November
| Brisbane
| W 102–94
| Casper Ware (23)
| Boone, Pledger (6)
| Casper Ware (6)
| Melbourne Arena7,656
| 8–3
|-style="background:#cfc;"
| 12
| 24 November
| Sydney
| W 84–82
| Casper Ware (23)
| D. J. Kennedy (12)
| Casper Ware (5)
| Melbourne Arena10,300
| 9–3

|-style="background:#fcc;"
| 13
| 8 December
| @ Brisbane
| L 97–94
| David Barlow (20)
| Alex Pledger (7)
| Casper Ware (9)
| Brisbane Convention Centre3,304
| 9–4
|-style="background:#fcc;"
| 14
| 10 December
| Brisbane
| L 74–90
| Casper Ware (22)
| David Barlow (9)
| David Barlow (5)
| Melbourne Arena7,083
| 9–5
|-style="background:#cfc;"
| 15
| 17 December
| Perth
| W 82–65
| Chris Goulding (21)
| Boone, Goulding, Kennedy, Pledger (7)
| Mitch McCarron (4)
| Melbourne Arena7,765
| 10–5
|-style="background:#cfc;"
| 16
| 23 December
| @ Sydney
| W 70–75
| Chris Goulding (16)
| David Barlow (11)
| Casper Ware (7)
| Qudos Bank Arena12,050
| 11–5
|-style="background:#fcc;"
| 17
| 26 December
| Adelaide
| L 101–103
| Casper Ware (26)
| D. J. Kennedy (5)
| Kennedy, Ware (5)
| Melbourne Arena10,300
| 11–6

|-style="background:#fcc;"
| 18
| 6 January
| @ Brisbane
| L 95–86
| Casper Ware (29)
| Josh Boone (10)
| McCarron, Smith-Milner (5)
| Gold Coast Sports and Leisure Centre4,485
| 11–7
|-style="background:#cfc;"
| 19
| 13 January
| @ Cairns
| W 89–99 (OT)
| Casper Ware (27)
| Josh Boone (15)
| Casper Ware (6)
| Cairns Convention Centre4,364
| 12–7
|-style="background:#fcc;"
| 20
| 20 January
| @ Perth
| L 84–79
| Mitch McCarron (21)
| Josh Boone (12)
| Casper Ware (6)
| RAC Arena13,353
| 12–8
|-style="background:#cfc;"
| 21
| 23 January
| Illawarra
| W 113–89
| Casper Ware (25)
| Josh Boone (11)
| Barlow, Kennedy, Ware (4)
| Melbourne Arena7,022
| 13–8
|-style="background:#cfc;"
| 22
| 28 January 
| @ Adelaide
| W 91–114
| Josh Boone (19)
| Josh Boone (10)
| Casper Ware (10)
| Titanium Security Arenanot available
| 14–8

|-style="background:#cfc;"
| 23
| 1 February
| @ New Zealand
| W 87–107
| Chris Goulding (24)
| Boone, Kennedy (11)
| Goulding, McCarron (5)
| Spark Arena4,714
| 15–8
|-style="background:#cfc;"
| 24
| 3 February
| New Zealand
| W 111–102 (OT)
| Mitch McCarron (25)
| D. J. Kennedy (9)
| Kennedy, McCarron (6)
| Melbourne Arena9,026
| 16–8
|-style="background:#fcc;"
| 25
| 8 February
| @ Sydney
| L 97–85
| Casper Ware (17)
| D. J. Kennedy (8)
| Casper Ware (5)
| Qudos Bank Arena7,104
| 16–9
|-style="background:#cfc;"
| 26
| 10 February
| @ Adelaide
| W 87–89
| Casper Ware (20)
| Josh Boone (14)
| Casper Ware (7)
| Titanium Security Arenanot available
| 17–9
|-style="background:#fcc;"
| 27
| 14 February
| Cairns
| L 85–87
| Chris Goulding (22)
| D. J. Kennedy (8)
| Goulding, Kennedy, McCarron, Ware (4)
| Melbourne Arena6,590
| 17–10
|-style="background:#cfc;"
| 28
| 17 February
| Perth
| W 81–70 (OT)
| D. J. Kennedy (21)
| D. J. Kennedy (15)
| D. J. Kennedy (6)
| Melbourne Arena10,300
| 18–10

Postseason 

|-style="background:#cfc;"
| 1
| 28 February
| Sydney
| W 95–73
| Casper Ware (22)
| Josh Boone (7)
| Casper Ware (7)
| Melbourne Arena 7,566
| 1–0
|-style="background:#cfc;"
| 2
| 3 March
| @ Sydney
| W 76–90
| Casper Ware (30)
| Josh Boone (8)
| Mitch McCarron (5)
| Qudos Bank Arena14,569
| 2–0

|-style="background:#fcc;"
| 3
| 8 March  
| @ Perth
| L 81–71
| Casper Ware (19)
| Josh Boone (12)
| Casper Ware (4)
| RAC Arena12,490
| 0–1
|-style="background:#cfc;"
| 4
| 10 March
| Perth
| W 92–74
| Goulding, Ware (14)
| D. J. Kennedy (14)
| Kennedy, McCarron (4)
| Melbourne Arena10,062
| 1–1
|-style="background:#fcc;"
| 5
| 15 March
| @ Perth
| L 96–67
| Barlow, Kennedy 13
| D. J. Kennedy (10)
| D. J. Kennedy (6)
| RAC Arena13,412
| 1–2
|-style="background:#fcc;"
| 6
| 17 March
| Perth
| L 84–97
| Casper Ware (18)
| Josh Boone (7)
| Goulding, Ware (4)
| Melbourne Arena 10,007
| 1–3

Transactions

Re-signed

Additions

Subtractions

Awards

NBL Awards 
 All-NBL First Team: Casper Ware

 Coach of the Year: Dean Vickerman

Melbourne United Awards 
 Most Valuable Player: Casper Ware 

 Best Defensive Player: David Barlow

 Coaches Award: Mitch McCarron

 Best Club Person Award: Fiona Gant

See also 

 2018–19 NBL season
 Melbourne United

References

External links 

 Official Website

Melbourne United
Melbourne United seasons
Melbourne United season